The 1948 Missouri gubernatorial election was held on November 2, 1948 and resulted in a victory for the Democratic nominee, State Auditor Forrest Smith, over the Republican nominee Murray Thompson, and candidates representing the Progressive, Socialist and Socialist Labor parties. Smith defeated Roy McKittrick for the nomination, while Thompson defeated Manvel H. Davis.

Results

References

Missouri
1948
Gubernatorial
November 1948 events in the United States